The Mayfield Brewery was a brewery that operated in Mayfield, California, between 1868 and 1920.  The brewery was located at what is now the corner of California Avenue and Birch Street in Palo Alto, California. It produced steam beer and sold it in kegs to local saloons.  The brewery was shut down by Prohibition.

History 
The Mayfield Railroad Brewery was started in 1868 in Mayfield, California (later annexed by Palo Alto) by Michel Kleinclaus, a native of Alsace.

The brewery was started on Lincoln near Third (now California Ave. and Park Blvd.) but was soon moved to
the corner of Second and Lincoln (now California Ave.and Birch St.).
At some point the brewery dropped "Railroad" from the name to become The Mayfield Brewery (probably after another brewery in the area operating as The Mayfield Brewery shut down).

In 1871, Christopher Ducker bought the brewery from Kleinclaus.  Ducker, a local merchant who was also running a saloon with his brother Henry, would go on to become a prominent citizen of Mayfield and a member of Mayfield's first board of trustees when the town incorporated in 1903.

For many of the years of Ducker's tenure as owner of the brewery, Mayfield came under pressure to become a dry town and close its saloons.  Mayfield had missed out on becoming Stanford University's service town because the town refused to close its saloons when Leland Stanford asked them in 1886.  Palo Alto was later formed and prospered as a dry university town while Mayfield maintained its image as a rowdy drinking town.  In 1904, soon after the town had incorporated, the town's board of trustees voted to become dry.  Chris Ducker, a member of the founding board, was the lone dissenting vote.  But, by a thin margin and with much debate, the board later voted to grant The Mayfield Brewery a special wholesale license to continue operating.

Ducker ran the brewery, sometimes with business partner Leonard Distel, until 1906 when he retired.

Ernest Klevesahl bought the brewery from Ducker in 1906 and ran it with his son, Carl Klevesahl, until it closed in 1920 due to Prohibition.

References

External links
 www.mayfieldbrewery.com

Beer brewing companies based in the San Francisco Bay Area
Defunct brewery companies of the United States
Companies based in Palo Alto, California

Food and drink companies established in 1868
Food and drink companies disestablished in 1920
1868 establishments in California
1920 disestablishments in California
Defunct manufacturing companies based in the San Francisco Bay Area